The 2008 NCAA Bowling Championship was the fifth annual tournament to determine the national champion of women's NCAA collegiate ten-pin bowling. The tournament was played in Omaha, Nebraska during April 2007.

Maryland–Eastern Shore defeated Arkansas State in the championship match, 4 games to 2, to win their first national title.

Qualification
Since there is only one national collegiate championship for women's bowling, all NCAA bowling programs (whether from Division I, Division II, or Division III) were eligible. A total of 8 teams were invited to contest this championship, which consisted of a modified double-elimination style tournament. Two more matches, comprising Round 5, were played this year.

Tournament bracket 
Site: Thunder Alley, Omaha, Nebraska

All-tournament team
Jessica Worsley, UMES
Maria Rodriguez, UMES
Maggie Adams, Arkansas State
Brittany Garcia, Vanderbilt
Vicki Spratford, New Jersey City

References

NCAA Bowling Championship
NCAA Bowling Championship
2008 in bowling
2008 in sports in Nebraska
April 2008 sports events in the United States